¿Qué pasó con Jacqueline? (English title: What happened to Jacqueline?) is a Venezuelan telenovela created by  Alicia Barrios and Gustavo Michelena which was broadcast by Radio Caracas Television in 1982. The telenovela lasted for 48 episodes.

Doris Wells starred in the dual role of Ana/Jacqueline alongside Jean Carlo Simancas as the protagonists.

Plot
Ana and Jacqueline are two orphaned twins. Ana suffers from a heart disease, and she is always assuming her sister's identity, to the point that she manipulates her way into taking Jacqueline's place in her marriage to architect Alejandro Ascanio. Jacqueline suffers an accident where her face gets disfigured, and she reappears with a new identity calling herself Melissa Vidal after reconstructive surgery. Her goal then becomes to conquer her husband again and to expose her twin sister who took over her identity.

Cast
Doris Wells
Jean Carlo Simancas
Víctor Cámara
Liliana Durán
Elba Escobar
Félix Loreto
Carlos Márquez
Yajaira Orta
Alicia Plaza

References

External links

1982 telenovelas
RCTV telenovelas
1982 Venezuelan television series debuts
1982 Venezuelan television series endings
Venezuelan telenovelas
Spanish-language telenovelas
Television shows set in Caracas